Muhammad Tahir Randhawa is a Pakistani politician who has been a member of the Provincial Assembly of the Punjab since August 2018.

Political career

He was elected to the Provincial Assembly of the Punjab as an independent candidate from Constituency PP-282 (Layyah-III) in 2018 Pakistani general election.

He joined Pakistan Tehreek-e-Insaf (PTI) following his election.
Mr Randhawa joined Imran Khan led Pakistan Tehreek-e-Insaf following a meeting with Jahangir Khan Tareen. In April 2021, Mr Randhawa attended a meeting with Jahangir Khan Tareen which was hosted by Mr Tareen following new sugar scandal cases against Jahangir Khan Tareen in Pakistan. Mr Tareen discussed his concerns with him along many other PTI’s MNAs and MPA’s. He de-seated due to vote against party policy for Chief Minister of Punjab election  on 16 April 2022

References

Living people
Pakistan Tehreek-e-Insaf MPAs (Punjab)
Year of birth missing (living people)